Streptomyces violaceochromogenes is a bacterium species from the genus of Streptomyces which has been isolated from soil. Streptomyces violaceochromogenes produces cinerubin x, cinerubin y, arugomycin and viriplanin D.

See also 
 List of Streptomyces species

References

Further reading

External links
Type strain of Streptomyces violaceochromogenes at BacDive -  the Bacterial Diversity Metadatabase

violaceochromogenes
Bacteria described in 1970